The Dead Talk Back is a crime film that was produced in 1957, but was not released until 1993. The film is also a  drama film with major subjects of the film being investigations, metaphysics, murder, police, and scientists.

Plot 
Scientist Henry Krasker (Farnese) experiments in speaking with the dead from the afterlife. He also is an occasional consultant to the Los Angeles Police Department and has solved numerous cases through extraordinary means. He lives in a rooming house that's convenient to his laboratory and is inhabited by a motley crew of less than reputable people.

After one of his rooming housemates, Renee Coliveil (Laura Brock), is murdered with a crossbow, Los Angeles police detectives Lieutenant Lewis (Scott Douglas) and Harry (Earl Sands) enlist Krasker to aid them in apprehending the suspect, who they believe lives at the same rooming house.

After an extensive investigation of the rooming house residents, Krasker devises a plan to draw out the killer. After calling a meeting of the rooming house residents Krasker brings Renee back from the dead, leading Raymond Millbrun (Myron Natwick), a DJ from San Francisco with wealthy parents, to cry out that he knew he didn't kill her.

However, it turns out to be a ruse: Krasker did not bring Renee back from the dead; he merely staged it in the belief that the actual killer would confess. Raymond had secretly married Renee in Mexico and she had been blackmailing him into silence for fear his parents would cut him out of their will.

With the killer in custody, the narrator (Lieutenant Lewis) muses over whether man will ever actually be able to contact the dead and wishes Krasker well in his experiments.

Cast 
 Aldo Farnese as Henry Krasker
 Scott Douglas as Lt. Lewis
 Laura Brock as Renee Coliveil (Caldwell)
 Earl Sands as Harry
 Myron H. Natwick as Raymond Milburn
 Kyle Stanton as Christy Mattling
 Sammy Ray as Tony Bettini
 Curtis Roberts as Fritz Kreuger
 Don Parker as Don Harris
 Jane Pritchard as Hope Byington

Production 
The Dead Talk Back was directed, written, and produced by Merle S. Gould. The film's production company was Headliner Productions, Inc.

Andrew Farnese was the cinematographer, Betty Schwartz was the art director, Aldo Farnese was the film editor, and Roland Schneider was in charge of sound. The costumers in the film were made by Wynn's. Jean Gerard was the production supervisor, Stan Pritchard was the production assistant, and Velmer Bahrenburg was the tech advisor.

Parts of the film were filmed in Lewin’s Records Center, Benny’s of Hollywood, and on Hollywood Boulevard. The Grauman's Chinese Theatre is visible in the background of the film. The film has voice-over narration intermittently by Aldo Farnese and Scott Douglas. The film is in black and white.

Release 
The Dead Talk Back was completed in 1957, but never had a theatrical release and was not distributed until it was discovered in 1993. Sinister Cinema acquired the rights to the film from Headliner Productions. It was then released on home video and later shown on the movie-mocking comedy television series Mystery Science Theater 3000 in 1994.

Reception 
The Dead Talk Back was featured in a 1994 episode in season six of the movie-mocking comedy television series Mystery Science Theater 3000. John Sinnott reviewed the episode in 2005 for DVD Talk, writing that "In this early Mike episode, he and the 'bots make a valiant effort to trash the film, but it only partially succeeds. There are long patches of the movie where nothing really happens and it's really hard to riff someone walking down the street. The jokes start out good, but by the end of the film you can tell that the writers were really scratching their heads for something, anything, to say about the film. Not a bad effort, but not a great one either."

The Dead Talk Back is part of The Psychotronic Video Guide, published in 1996 by Michael J. Weldon.

The Dead Talk Back was featured and reviewed in the book 150 Movies You Should Die Before You See by Steve Miller. The book was published in 2010 by Simon & Schuster. Miller wrote that  "A rooming house full of bizarre possible suspects, an unusual detective, and a suitably twisted solution to the case ... The Dead Talk Back could have been a fun, quirky mystery film. But then it went in for bad acting, inept direction, shoddy camera-work, badly done lighting, and horrendous editing. Even a second draft on the script would have helped." Miller also commented that "The Worst Script Award goes to Merle S. Gould for his attempts to infuse the film with a 'hardboiled detective' that are so over-blown they ruin what could have been a cool murder scene" and that the "You Made James Randi Cry Award goes to Merle S. Gould for conceiving an experiment in otherworldly communication that involves a speaker, some wire, a wineglass, and a razor blade."

The Dead Talk Back was reviewed in the 2015 book Spinegrinder: The Movies Most Critics Won’t Write About, author Clive Davies writing that "It's no worse than others from the period, but don't expect a neglected gem. A bearded "Private Investigator" and mad scientist (that's more like it) introduces the very slow-moving tale from his basement lab where he has a device for talking to the dead (it looks like a rock). 'Oh it's true,' he exclaims before narrating a long flashback that's mostly cops interrogating the prime suspects in a murder-by-crossbow case. The ending is straight out of a Tod Slaughter movie."

References

External links 
 
TCM.com

1993 films
1990s mystery films
1950s rediscovered films
1993 horror films
Rediscovered American films
1990s English-language films
1950s English-language films